The European Humanist Federation (EHF), officially abbreviated as EHF-FHE, was an umbrella of more than 60 humanist and secularist organisations from 25 European countries. 

Founded in Prague in July 1991, the EHF was based in Brussels, where it employed a small team of staff focused on European Union policy advocacy and capacity-building in European humanist organisations. Its advocacy activities are primarily focused on the European Parliament, European Commission, and other bodies associated with the European Union and Council of Europe, as part of its mission to promote a humanist vision of Europe. It was the largest umbrella organisation of humanist associations in Europe, promoting a secular Europe, defending equal treatment of everyone regardless of religion or belief, and fighting religious conservatism and privilege in Europe and at the European Union level. It closely collaborated with alongside Humanists International for much of its existence. When it dissolved in 2022, its activities had largely been taken over by Humanists International.

The EHF was the parent body of the European Humanist Professionals (EHP), which networks humanist celebrants, humanist pastoral carers, school speakers and educators, and the staff of the various European humanist associations into one professional body, focused on building best practice and expanding the availability of humanist charitable services across Europe. This work became part of Humanists International's European Capacity Building and Networking Project.

Goals
The EHF promotes a secular state and opposes lobbying by religious organisations towards European institutions. The EHF aims to: 
 Achieve separation between religion and the state throughout Europe;
 Defend freedom of religion and belief, which includes the right not to believe and the right to change one's belief;
 Defend freedom of thought and speech, which implies opposition to laws prohibiting "blasphemy";
 Promote non-discrimination on all grounds (ethnic or national origin, religion and belief, disability, age, gender, sexual orientation, etc.), inspired by the EHF's humanistic conviction that all men and women are born free and equal;
 Support women's sexual and reproductive health and rights when and where they are threatened.

Actions
The EHF was recognised as an official partner of the European Union (EU) under Article 17 of the Treaty on the Functioning of the European Union (TFEU). It is therefore regularly invited to meet the Presidents of the Commission, the European Parliament and the European Council. The EHF also participates in meetings of the European Parliament Platform for Secularism in Politics (EPPSP). At the EU level, it also works with the European External Action Service (EEAS) and the European Union Agency for Fundamental Rights (FRA), whilst also collaborating with the Council of Europe and the Organization for Security and Co-operation in Europe (OSCE).

Examples of EHF campaigns
 Sexual and Reproductive Rights ARE Human Rights
 EU Guidelines on Freedom of Religion and Beliefs: Securing a Balanced and Secular Approach
 Keep Dogma Out of European Research
 Opposing Tonio Borg's nomination at European Commission
 No to Special Rights for Churches in the EU

The EHF also supports its 63 member organisations in the challenges they are facing at a domestic level and works in partnership with a large network of associations – including progressive religious organisations – with whom it shared goals and interests, in order to oppose conservative religious lobbies across Europe.

A Vision for Europe and the Brussels Declaration 
As the centrepiece of their campaign A Vision for Europe, that strove to uphold secularism within the EU, the EHF, the IHEU and Catholics for Choice (endorsed by the EPPSP) jointly presented the "Brussels Declaration" on 27 February 2007 in the European Parliament, and also addressed to the 27 EU heads of government. It was widely supported by European politicians (signed by more than 80 MEPs), academics, scientists, Nobel Prize winners, writers and journalists. The Brussels Declaration was a response to the would-be Berlin Declaration, which, being negotiated at the time and set to become the preamble to the amended EU Constitution, contained references to God and the supposed "Christian roots of Europe". Eventually these references were left out, and a strong emphasis on individual rights and dignity included, much to the relief of David Pollock (former EHF president), Sophie in 't Veld (EPPSP chairwoman) and Roy W. Brown (former IHEU president), the last of whom called it "a victory for Secularism in Europe".

Members
The following list contains all member organisations of the EHF (as of 2014).Note: Official English names of organisations are given priority. Organisations that lack an official English name have been translated as literally as possible whilst retaining their intended meaning and complying with English grammar and conventions.

See also 
List of secularist organizations

References

External links
  (Official website)
  (Facebook)
  (Twitter)